Oddone is both a surname and a given name. Notable people with the name include:

Surname
Frederic Oddone, American judge
María Elena Oddone, Argentine writer and activist
Piermaria Oddone (born 1944), Peruvian-American physicist

Given name
Oddone Frangipane (fl. 1130–1170), Italian noble
Oddone di Monferrato (died 1251), Italian cardinal

See also
 Ottone (disambiguation)